Fair Complex/Hillsboro Airport is a light rail station on the MAX Blue Line in Hillsboro, Oregon, United States. It is the 16th stop westbound on the Westside MAX, and the last westbound stop prior to crossing the Main Street Bridge. The station is located close to the Westside Commonsthe 2019-adopted new name for the Washington County Fair Complexand Hillsboro Airport, a major general-aviation facility in Hillsboro, and the location of the Oregon International Airshow in the summer. Bus line 46-North Hillsboro serves the station.

History
Construction of TriMet’s Westside MAX project began in 1994, with the Fairplex station opening on September 12, 1998, along with the rest of the line west of Downtown Portland. A person was struck and killed by a MAX train at the station in April 2001. In June 2004, the station was the site of a failed armed robbery where the robber's gun failed to fire. In 2007, plans for redesigning the county fairgrounds were announced and included a proposal to create a large exhibition hall that would connect to the MAX station via a public plaza. In March 2011, TriMet received a federal grant to pay for the installation of security cameras at the station.

Amenities
Located south of northeast Cornell Road on northeast 34th Avenue, the station is adjacent to the Washington County Fair Complexrenamed Westside Commons in 2019and directly south of the Hillsboro Airport. Passengers can travel west to downtown Hillsboro or east to Portland and Gresham from the stop. The station has a park-and-ride lot and bus connections to the number 46 line. Designed by architectural firm OTAK Inc., the station features an island platform and a side platform along the two tracks, with a third track to the west used for parking extra trains utilized for increased capacity during special events such as the county fair and the Oregon International Airshow. The station also includes bike lockers and bike racks, is compliant with the Americans with Disabilities Act, and has a seasonal concessions stand.

Across the street from the station's parking lot, a new  conference center and exhibition hall, known as the Wingspan Event & Conference Center, opened in August 2020, replacing buildings demolished in 2018.

Artwork

As with all stations along the Westside MAX line, the Fair Complex station includes public artwork, with the theme of pride in achievement for this stop. One item is a weather vane featuring five model airplanes designed by Glen Geller and Curt Oliver. An additional piece of art at the station is a large metal sculpture of a trophy designed by Bill Will. Entitled "World's Greatest", the wire cup is a topiary covered in ivy sitting atop a cement block base. Additionally, historic photographs featuring the county fair are etched into the glass of the windscreen, while tree rooms create shade.

References

External links

Station information (with eastbound ID number) from TriMet
Station information (with westbound ID number) from TriMet
MAX Light Rail Stations – more general TriMet page

MAX Light Rail stations
Transportation in Hillsboro, Oregon
Railway stations in the United States opened in 1998
MAX Blue Line
Bus stations in Oregon
1998 establishments in Oregon
Railway stations in Washington County, Oregon